Sidhhanath Temple may also refer to;

 Bhoodsidhhanath regarding Siddhanath Temple located in Bhood
 Sidhhanath Temple, Kharsundi regarding Siddhanath Temple located in Kharsundi, also known as Kharsundisiddhanath
 Siddhanath Temple, Mhaswad regarding Siddhanath Temple located in Mhaswad, also known as Mhaswadsiddhanath
 Revansiddha Temple regarding Revan Sidhhanath Temple located in Renavi
 Sidhhanath Temple, in Nemawar
 Sidhhanath Temple, in Siddhanath near Kanamadi located in Jath Taluk of Sangli District

Religious buildings and structures disambiguation pages